Marina Mampay (born 9 June 1962) is a former Belgian racing cyclist. She finished in second place in the Belgian National Road Race Championships in 1981.

References

External links
 

1962 births
Living people
Belgian female cyclists
People from Lier, Belgium
Cyclists from Antwerp Province